An actress is a female performer in films, plays, radio, or TV.

Actress may also refer to:

Film
 The Actress (1928 film), a lost 1928 American silent drama film
 Actress (1943 film), a Soviet comedy film
 The Actress, a 1953 American comedy-drama film
 An Actress (1956), a Japanese film
 Actrius or Actresses, a 1997 Catalan-language film
 Actress (2007 film), a Russian comedy film
 Actresses (film), a 2009 South Korean mockumentary-style drama film by E J-yong
 Actress (2014 film), an American documentary film by Robert Greene

Music
 Actress (band) or New York Dolls, an American hard rock band formed in New York City in 1971
 Actress – "Birth of the New York Dolls" (1972)
 Actress (musician) or Darren J. Cunningham, British electronic musician

Other uses
 Actress (Greenland), the highest peak of the Lemon Range in Eastern Greenland

See also 
 Actresses' Franchise League
 Actress in the House
 Best Actress
 Joyu (disambiguation)
 Lists of actresses